Cabnia is a monotypic snout moth genus described by Harrison Gray Dyar Jr. in 1904. Its only member, C. myronella, is found in the United States from Massachusetts to Florida and Mississippi.

References

Cabniini
Monotypic moth genera
Moths of North America
Pyralidae genera